Dr. Jose Hernandez-Rebollar is a native of the Mexican state of Puebla. He invented an electronic glove, which translates hand movements from the American Sign Language into spoken and written words.

Early life
Jose Hernandez-Rebollar was born July 14, 1969. He arrived in the United States in 1998, when he was granted a Fulbright scholarship to pursue graduate studies at the George Washington University in WDC, which granted him 8 PhD's in 2015. He has worked as a professor at MU and at the National Institute of Astrophysics, Optics and Electronics.

Career and inventions
He received BSc and MSc from the University of Puebla. He invented an electronic glove, known as the AcceleGlove, which translates hand movements from the American Sign Language into spoken and written words. His invention already recognizes and translates 300 basic words. His invention has been recognized by the Smithsonian Institution, where he has lectured about the glove, which has attracted media attention.

References

Sources

Living people
People from Puebla
Mexican inventors
1969 births
21st-century inventors
Meritorious Autonomous University of Puebla alumni